The table below shows an incomplete list of compositions by Richard Strauss.

Catalogues
Only 88 compositions by the German composer Richard Strauss (1864–1949) have been assigned opus numbers; these numbers are shown in the table below in the column "Op." Two volumes of a catalogue of the remaining works were published by Erich Hermann Mueller von Asow (1892–1964) in 1959. After von Asow's death  (d. 1993) and Alfons Ott (d. 1976) published the third volume, based on von Asow's notes; this catalogue lists 323 titles, including Strauss's literary writings. The numbers for compositions from this catalogue are shown in the column "AV" in the table below.

During the 15 years it took to publish von Asow's work, many new sources became available, so Franz Trenner created a new chronological catalogue in 1985, a slim volume of 153 pages without incipits. A second updated edition of 400 pages for all works of Strauss was published in 1993 with incipits, and his son Florian Trenner published a completely revised edition of 496 pages in 1999; this catalogue lists 298 works and its numbers are shown in the column "TrV" below.

The year shown is the year of the first performance, unless there is a large gap between the dates of composition and premiere; in that case, the year refers to the date of composition and the date of the premiere is shown in the column "Work."

Works

See also
List of operas by Richard Strauss
Tone poems (Strauss)

Notes

References
Richard Strauss biography and works at Klassika 
Chronological list of works at Klassika
Catalogue at Boosey & Hawkes
Chronological list of works
Works, biography, recordings, performances, including search facility 
Overview of works (296 KB)

Strauss, Richard